The Red River, also known as the Hong River (Chữ Nôm: 瀧紅; Chữ Hán: 紅河), the  and  (lit. "Mother River") in Vietnamese, and the  (Nguyên Giang) in Chinese, is a -long river that flows from Yunnan in Southwest China through northern Vietnam to the Gulf of Tonkin. According to C. Michael Hogan, the associated Red River Fault was instrumental in forming the entire South China Sea at least as early as 37 million years before present. The name red and southern position in China are associated in traditional cardinal directions.

Geography 
The Red River begins in China's Yunnan province in the mountains south of Dali. Main headstreams Leqiu River, Xi River and Juli River confluence at Nanjian where they form the Lishe River. The Lishe River meets with another headstream, the Yijie River at Hongtupo, Chuxiong Prefecture. It flows generally southeastward, passing through Yi and Dai ethnic minority areas before leaving China through Yunnan's Honghe Autonomous Prefecture. It enters Vietnam at Lào Cai province and forms a portion of the international border between China and Vietnam. The river, known as Thao River for this upper stretch, continues its southeasterly course through northwestern Vietnam before emerging from the mountains to reach the midlands. Its main tributaries, the Black River (Da River) and Lô River join in to form the very broad Hồng near the city of Việt Trì, Phú Thọ province. 

Downstream from Việt Trì, the river and its main distributaries, the Đuống River, Kinh Thầy River, Bạch Đằng River and the Thái Bình river system spread out to form the Red River Delta. The Red River flows past the Vietnamese capital Hanoi before emptying into the Gulf of Tonkin. Its estuary is an important Ramsar site and forms the main part of the Xuân Thủy National Park. 

The reddish-brown heavily silt-laden water gives the river its name. The Red River is notorious for its violent floods with its seasonally wide volume fluctuations. Intense seasonal floods are made worse by erosion, development, and pollution. The delta is a major agricultural area of Vietnam with vast area devoted to rice. The land is protected by an elaborate network of dikes and levees.

As a travel and transportation route
In the 19th century, the Red River was thought to be a lucrative trade route to China. The late 19th-century French explorers were able to travel up the Red River until Manhao in South Yunnan, and then overland toward Kunming.

The Red River remained the main commercial travel route between the French Indochina and Yunnan until the opening of the Kunming–Haiphong Railway in 1910. Although French steamers would be able to go as far upstream as Lao Cai during the rainy season, during the dry season (November to April) steamship would not go upstream of Yên Bái; thus, during that part of the year goods were moved by small vessels (junks).

Thanks to the river, Haiphong was in the early 20th century the sea port most easily accessible from Kunming. Still, the travel time between Haiphong and Kunming was reckoned by the Western authorities at 28 days: it  involved 16 days of travel by steamer and then a small boat up the Red River to Manhao (425 miles), and then 12 days overland (194 miles) to Kunming.

Manhao was considered the head of navigation for the smallest vessels (wupan 五版); so Yunnan's products such as tin would be brought to Manhao by pack mules, where they would be loaded to boats to be sent downstream. On the Manhao to Lao Cai section, where the current may be quite fast, especially during the freshet season, traveling upstream in an wupan was much more difficult than downstream. According to one report, one could descend from Manhao to Lao Cai in just 10 hours, while sailing in the reverse direction could take 10 days, and sometimes as much as one month.

Dams
Several hydroelectric dams have been constructed on the Red River in Yunnan:
 Da Wan Dam
 Dachunhe I Dam
 Dachunhe II Dam
 Nansha Dam, near Nansha Town, Yuanyang County
 Madushan Dam, near Manhao Town, Gejiu City

Many more dams exist on the Red River's tributaries, both in Yunnan and in Vietnam. One of the earliest of them is the Thác Bà Dam in Vietnam, constructed in 1972, which forms the Thác Bà Lake.

Settlements

China (中國) 
 Yunnan (雲南)
Honghe (紅河)
 Nansha Town, the county seat of Yuanyang County, Yunnan (南沙鎮)
 Manhao Town (Gejiu County-level City) (蔓耗鎮)
 Hekou Yao Autonomous County (河口瑤族自治縣)

Vietnam (Việt Nam) 

 Hà Nội 
Tây Hồ district
 Ba Đình district
 Hoàn Kiếm district
 Hai Bà Trưng district
 Long Biên district
 Gia Lâm district
 Hoàng Mai district
 Ba Vì district
 Đan Phượng district
 Đông Anh district
 Mê Linh district
 Phúc Thọ district
 Phú Xuyên district
 Sơn Tây town
 Thanh Trì district
 Thường Tín district
 Từ Liêm district
 Hà Nam province 
Duy Tiên district 
 Lý Nhân district 
 Hưng Yên province 
Văn Giang district 
 Khoái Châu district 
 Kim Động district 
 Hưng Yên 
 Tiên Lữ district 
 Lào Cai province 
Bảo Yên district 
 Bảo Thắng district 
 Nam Định province 
Nam Trực district
 Giao Thủy district 
 Trực Ninh district 
 Xuân Trường district 
 Phú Thọ province 
Cẩm Khê district (old name: Sông Thao district) 
 Hạ Hòa 
 Lâm Thao 
 Phú Thọ 
 Tam Nông 
 Thanh Ba
 Thanh Thủy 
 Việt Trì 
 Thái Bình province 
Hưng Hà district 
 Vũ Thư district
 Kiến Xương district 
 Tiền Hải district 
 Vĩnh Phúc province 
Vĩnh Tường district 
 Yên Lạc district 
 Yên Bái province 
Trấn Yên district 
 Văn Yên district

See also
Yuan River and Yuanjiang (disambiguation)
Red River Delta
Red River Fault
Geography of China
Geography of Vietnam

References
 Administration, E., & Hogan, C. (2013). South China Sea. Retrieved from Encyclopedia of Earth
 earthtrends.wri.org, Water Resources eAtlas, Hong (Red River)

External links

 
Rivers of Yunnan
Rivers of Hanoi
Rivers of Hưng Yên province
Rivers of Nam Định province
Rivers of Thái Bình province
Rivers of Lào Cai province
Rivers of Yên Bái province
Rivers of Phú Thọ province
Rivers of Vĩnh Phúc province
Rivers of Hà Nam province
International rivers of Asia
Gulf of Tonkin
China–Vietnam border
Geography of Dali Bai Autonomous Prefecture
Geography of Chuxiong Yi Autonomous Prefecture
Geography of Yuxi
Geography of Honghe Hani and Yi Autonomous Prefecture
Rivers of Vietnam